Louis II may refer to:

 Louis II, Holy Roman Emperor (825–875)
 Louis the German (804–876), king of East Francia
 Louis the Stammerer (846–879), Louis II of France
 Louis II, Count of Chiny (died before 1066)
 Louis II, Landgrave of Thuringia (1128–1172)
 Louis II, Count of Loon (died 1218)
 Louis II, Duke of Bavaria (1229–1294)
 Louis I of Flanders, Louis II of Nevers, (1304–1346)
 Louis II, Elector of Brandenburg (1328–1365)
 Louis II of Châtillon (died 1372)
 Louis II of Flanders (1330–1384)
 Louis II d'Évreux (1336–1400)
 Louis II, Duke of Bourbon (1337–1410)
 Louis II, Count of Blois (died 1346)
 Louis II of Naples (1377–1417)
 Louis II, Duke of Brieg (1380–1436)
 Louis II, Landgrave of Lower Hesse (1438–1471)
 Louis II, Count of Wuerttemberg (1439–1457)
 Louis II, Duke of Orléans (1462–1515)
 Louis II, Count of Montpensier (1483–1501)
 Louis II de la Trémoille (1460–1525), French general
 Louis II, Count Palatine of Zweibrücken (1502–1532)
 Louis II of Hungary and Bohemia (1506–1526)
 Louis II, Duke of Longueville (1510–1537)
 Louis II, Cardinal of Guise (1555–1588)
 Louis II, Count of Nassau-Weilburg (1565–1627)
 Louis II de Bourbon, Prince de Condé (1621–1686), "the Great Condé"
 Louis II, Grand Duke of Hesse (1777–1848)
 Louis II of Holland (1804–1831)
 Louis II, Grand Duke of Baden (1824–1858)
 Ludwig II of Bavaria (1845–1886), "Mad King Ludwig"
 Louis II, Prince of Monaco (1870–1949)
 Luís Filipe, Prince Royal of Portugal (1887–1908), a.k.a. Louis II, Duke of Braganza
 Louis XIII, also known as Louis II of Navarre (1601–1643)

See also
Ludwig II (disambiguation)